Marco Antonio Collao Ramos (born 11 April 1998) is a Chilean footballer who plays for Antofagasta.

Callao Ramos began his career at the age of 15 playing for the Chilean football club, Coquimbo Unido. Callao Ramos has stated that his role model is Charles Aránguiz.

References

1998 births
Living people
Chilean footballers
Chilean Primera División players
Coquimbo Unido footballers
C.D. Antofagasta footballers
Association football midfielders